HMS Narcissus was a Sphinx-class 20-gun sixth-rate post ship of the Royal Navy launched in 1781. Most notably in 1782, while she was under the command of Captain Edward Edwards, a mutiny occurred aboard the vessel that resulted in the hanging of six men, and the flogging of an additional 14. Captain Edwards went on to command HMS Pandora, which was assigned to carry the Bounty mutineers back to England.

Fate
Narcissus was wrecked in 1796.

References

Sixth-rate frigates of the Royal Navy
1781 ships
Ships built in Plymouth, Devon
Maritime incidents in 1796